The Werner von Siemens Ring (in German orthography, Werner-von-Siemens-Ring) is one of the highest awards for technical sciences in Germany.

It has been awarded from 1916 to 1941 and since 1952 about every three years by the foundation Stiftung Werner-von-Siemens-Ring. The foundation was established on 13 December 1916 on the occasion of the 100th anniversary of the birth of Werner von Siemens. It is located in Berlin and is traditionally managed by the Deutscher Verband Technisch-Wissenschaftlicher Vereine (DVT) (English: German Federation of Technical and Scientific Associations). Before 1960, the name of the award had been simply Siemens Ring (German Siemens-Ring or Siemensring).

The award is presented as a golden ring with emeralds and rubies depicting the leaves and fruit of laurel, placed in an individually crafted cassette carrying the portrait of Werner von Siemens and the dedication to the recipient.

According to the statutes, patron of the foundation council is the President of Germany, and the President of the Physikalisch-Technische Bundesanstalt is the foundation council's executive chairman. The council votes on the recipients. Members of the council are the bearers of the ring and representatives of the member scientific and technical societies.

Recipients
Source: Werner von Siemens Ring Foundation

See also 

 List of general science and technology awards 
 List of engineering awards

References

External links

Engineering awards
Awards established in 1916
German awards
Siemens